Limnae or Limnai, was an ancient Greek city dating back to 7th century B.C. on the Gallipoli peninsula. The city was founded by migrants coming from Ionia. The city was one of the richest and most busy seaports of the Gallipoli region in its time and maintained its existence until the Roman era.

Limnae is covered by several ancient authors. Strabo places Limnae between Drabus and Alopeconnesus. According to Anaximenes of Miletus, it was a colony of Miletus. It belonged to the Delian League as it appears in Athenian tribute lists from 447/6 to 429/8 BCE. Limnae also appears in Stephanus of Byzantium and Pseudo-Scymnus.

Until 2018, the existence of the ancient city was known from ancient texts, but the exact location was not certain. In 2018, the city was discovered near the Beşyol plain. According to the archaeologists: "Only pieces of bowls, crockery and tiles can be seen on the surface since the architectural remnants of the city are underground. However, these pieces give us information about the field the city covered, as well as when the city was established and when it was desolated."

References

Gallipoli Peninsula
Populated places in ancient Thrace
Former populated places in Turkey
Ancient Greek archaeological sites in Turkey
Archaeological sites in the Aegean Region
Ionian colonies in Thrace
Greek colonies in the Thracian Chersonese
2018 archaeological discoveries
History of Çanakkale Province